Onesiphorus (meaning "bringing profit" or "useful") was a Christian referred to in the New Testament letter of Second Timothy ( and ). According to the letter sent by St. Paul, Onesiphorus sought out Paul who was imprisoned at the time in Rome.

Life
According to Orthodox tradition, Saint Onesiphorus was one of the seventy disciples chosen and sent by Jesus to preach. They were chosen some time after the selection of the Twelve Apostles (Luke 10:1-24). St Onesiphorus was bishop at Colophon (Asia Minor), and later at Corinth. Both the Orthodox and Roman Catholic churches hold that he died a martyr in the city of Parium (not far from Ephesus) on the shores of the Hellespont.

2 Timothy
The persecution of Christians during Nero’s reign made Rome a dangerous city for Christians. Paul praises Onesiphorus for his hospitality, kindness, and courage. Onesiphorus is contrasted with the other Christians in Asia who have deserted Paul at this time. In 2 Timothy 1:16-18, Paul sends a greeting to the man’s household in Ephesus and refers to the help he showed Paul earlier in Ephesus. Timothy, who led the Ephesian church is familiar with these acts. Paul's praise of Onesiphorus is significant because it was written shortly before Paul's death as a final encouragement to Timothy.

But now, at the time of correspondence, only "Luke alone is with (Paul)" (4:11). Because Paul speaks of Onesiphorus only in the past tense, wishes blessings upon his house (family), and mercy for him "in that day", some scholars believe that Onesiphorus had at this point died.

He is commemorated on September 6 in Roman Catholic Church, and September 7 in Orthodox Church.

He should not be confused with the Onesiphorus of Ephesus who was martyred with Porphyrius during the Diocletian persecution, and is commemorated on November 9.

References

External links
 Sant' Onesiforo su santiebeati.it
 St. Onesiphorus - Saints & Angels

Seventy disciples
Saints from Roman Anatolia